TechEye is a British technology news and opinion website. It was founded by Mike Magee, James Crowley, and Allan Rutherford in January 2010.

References

External links
Official website

Computer magazines published in the United Kingdom
British news websites
Publications established in 2010